Erythranthe pulsiferae is a species of monkeyflower known by the common names candelabrum monkeyflower and Pulsifer's monkeyflower. It was formerly known as Mimulus pulsiferae. It is native to the western United States from Washington to northern California, where it grows in wet habitat such as streambanks. It is an annual herb growing 2 to 21 centimeters tall. The leaves occur in a basal rosette and oppositely along the stem, each on a short petiole and with an oval blade. The tubular base of the flower is encapsulated in a ribbed calyx of sepals with tiny pointed lobes. The flower is roughly a centimeter long and yellow in color, sometimes with red spotting or pink-tinged white coloration in the mouth.

References

External links
Jepson Manual Treatment
USDA Plants Profile
Photo gallery

pulsiferae
Flora of California
Flora of Oregon
Flora of Washington (state)
Flora of the Cascade Range
Flora without expected TNC conservation status